The ADAC 1000 Kilometer Rennen took place on 7 June, on the Nürburgring Nordschleife, (West Germany).  It was also the third round of the F.I.A. World Sports Car Championship.

Report

Entry

A massive total of 77 racing cars were registered for this event, of which 68 arrived for practice and started the long distance race on the 14.174 mile German circuit. David Brown who had won the event in 1957 and again in 1958 sent along just one Aston Martin DBR1 over from England for Stirling Moss/Jack Fairman. As for championship leaders, Porsche, this was their home event and they arrived with two different cars; 356A and 718 RSK for their squad of drivers led by Wolfgang von Trips and Jo Bonnier.

Scuderia Ferrari would head the Italian challenge. Ferrari had three works 250 TR 59s in the Eifel mountains, Tony Brooks/Jean Behra, Phil Hill/Olivier Gendebien and Dan Gurney/Cliff Allison. They were joined by a fleet of privateer drivers in their Alfa Romeos, Porsche 356A Carreras Oscas and other mainline sportscars.

Qualifying

Qualifying was held over three sessions for a total of 1,710 minutes over the three days prior to the race. The Ferrari 250 TR of Behra took pole position, averaging a speed of 88.33 mph around the 14.173 mile circuit.

Race

With each lap over 14 miles in length, the race covered a total of 44 laps, or 1,000 miles, the Nordschleife was a fearsome thing to behold. A crowd of approximately 200,000 in attendance came to witness the race, despite a day of intermittent rain.

As for the race, victory went to the Aston Martin DBR1/300 of Moss and Fairman, gaining the marque their first points of the season, to win for the third time in a row. The victory was one of Moss's greatest drives, having to make up for time lost while Fairman drove. The winning partnership, won in a time of 7hr 33:18.0 mins, averaging a speed of 89.204 mph. The margin of triumph over the Ferrari of Hill/Gendebein was 41secs., who were followed home by their team-mates Brooks/Behra who were 3min 27s adrift of the Aston. The first of the Porsches came home in fourth, with Umberto Maglioli/Hans Herrmann winning their class. Moss's pace was so quick that his fastest lap of the race, was faster than Behra's pole lap by over five seconds. The race continued for another hour to allow the other classes/division to try and complete the full 1000 km.

Official Classification

Class Winners are in Bold text.

 Fastest Lap: Stirling Moss, 9:32.0secs (89.204 mph)

Class Winners

Standings after the race

Note: Only the top five positions are included in this set of standings.Championship points were awarded for the first six places in each race in the order of 8-6-4-3-2-1. Manufacturers were only awarded points for their highest finishing car with no points awarded for positions filled by additional cars. Only the best 3 results out of the 5 races could be retained by each manufacturer. Points earned but not counted towards the championship totals are listed within brackets in the above table.

References

Nurburgring
6 Hours of Nürburgring
Nurburgring